Pavel Mráz (born 18 June 1974 in Ústí nad Labem) is a Czech sprint canoeist who competed in the mid-1990s. He was eliminated in the semifinals of the K-4 1000 m event at the 1996 Summer Olympics in Atlanta.

References
 Sports-Reference.com profile

1968 births
Canoeists at the 1996 Summer Olympics
Czech male canoeists
Living people
Olympic canoeists of the Czech Republic
Sportspeople from Ústí nad Labem